"Tatipudi Reservoir" is a dam located on River Gosthani in Andhra Pradesh. It is a water supply reservoir to the city of Visakhapatnam. Thatipudi Reservoir Project was constructed across Gosthani River during 1963–1968. The Project utilizes 3.325 tmcft of the available water and the reservoir storage capacity is about 3 tmcft. The Cost of the project is Rs. 1,820 crores. The Ayacut of  has been stabilised in Gantyada, S.Kota and Jami Mandals of Vizianagaram District.

References

External links

Reservoirs in Visakhapatnam
Reservoirs in Andhra Pradesh
Buildings and structures in Vizianagaram district
Geography of Vizianagaram district
1968 establishments in Andhra Pradesh
Dams completed in 1968
Uttarandhra
20th-century architecture in India